The 2016 Japan Women's Open (also known as the 2016 Hashimoto Sogyo Japan Women's Open for sponsorship reasons) was a women's tennis tournament played on outdoor hard courts. It was the eighth edition of the Japan Women's Open, and part of the WTA International tournaments of the 2016 WTA Tour. It was held at the Ariake Coliseum in Tokyo, Japan, from September 12 through September 18, 2016.

Point distribution

Prize money

1 Qualifiers prize money is also the Round of 32 prize money
2 Per team

Singles main-draw entrants

Seeds

 Rankings are as of August 29, 2016

Other entrants
The following players received wildcards into the singles main draw:
  Misa Eguchi 
  Eri Hozumi 
  Risa Ozaki

The following players received entry from the qualifying draw:
  Jang Su-jeong 
  Miyu Kato 
  Rebecca Peterson
  Erika Sema

The following players received entry as a lucky loser:
  Antonia Lottner

Withdrawals
Before the tournament
  Misa Eguchi → replaced by  Antonia Lottner
  Irina Falconi → replaced by  Kurumi Nara
  Kirsten Flipkens → replaced by  Jana Čepelová
  Nicole Gibbs → replaced by  Magda Linette
  Hsieh Su-wei → replaced by  Anett Kontaveit
  Kristína Kučová → replaced by  Naomi Osaka
  Jeļena Ostapenko → replaced by  Tamira Paszek
  Anastasija Sevastova → replaced by  Nao Hibino
  Wang Qiang → replaced by  Maria Sakkari

Doubles main-draw entrants

Seeds

1 Rankings are as of August 29, 2016

Other entrants
The following pairs received wildcards into the doubles main draw:
  Daniela Hantuchová /  Alison Riske
  Kanae Hisami /  Kotomi Takahata

Champions

Singles

 Christina McHale def.  Kateřina Siniaková, 3–6, 6–4, 6–4

Doubles

  Shuko Aoyama /  Makoto Ninomiya def.  Jocelyn Rae /  Anna Smith, 6–3, 6–3

External links

 
Japan Women's Open
Japan Women's Open
Japan Women's Open
September 2016 sports events in Japan